Angie   is a 1993 Dutch crime thriller film directed by Martin Lagestee. The film is about a girl named Angie (Annemarie Röttgering) who becomes involved in a life of crime.

Plot
After her return from an orphanage with her mother, Angie tries again to build a normal life. The mutual distrust is enormous. After a nasty incident with her mother's new friend Angie turns to her older brother Alex, a delinquent. While Angie is determined to make something of her life, she gets quickly caught up in the criminal world and pulls off a heist with her brother and crew and hit the road.

Cast
Annemarie Röttgering	 ... 	Angie Kempers
Derek de Lint	... 	Peter Koudbier
Daniël Boissevain	... 	Alex, Angie's older brother
Hidde Schols	... 	Frank Rothuizen
Marijke Veugelers	... 	Angie's mother
Peter Tuinman	... 	Detective Burger
Jack Wouterse	... 	Frits

References

External links 
 

Dutch crime thriller films
1993 films
1990s Dutch-language films
1993 crime thriller films
1990s road movies